Andraž Šporar (born 27 February 1994) is a Slovenian professional footballer who plays as a forward for Super League Greece club Panathinaikos and the Slovenia national team.

Club career

Olimpija Ljubljana 
In June 2012, Šporar transferred from Interblock to Olimpija Ljubljana. In the 2015–16 Slovenian PrvaLiga season, Šporar was named a team captain. During the first half of the club's season, he played 18 PrvaLiga games and scored 17 goals.

Basel 
On 8 December 2015, Basel announced that Šporar had signed a four-and-a-half-year contract up until the end of June 2020. He joined Basel's first team for their 2015–16 season under head coach Urs Fischer. After playing in four friendly games, he made his Swiss Super League debut on 14 February 2016 in a 4–0 away win against Grasshopper Club. Just a few days later, on 18 February, Šporar got injured during warm-up before the away match against Saint-Étienne. The torn tendon required surgery and this kept Šporar out for the rest of the season. At the end of the season his team won the 2015–16 Swiss Super League championship.

Šporar scored his first goal for Basel on 15 April 2017 in a 4–0 away victory over Lausanne-Sport. At the end of the 2016–17 Super League season, Šporar won the championship for the second time. For the club this was the eighth title in a row and their 20th championship title in total. They also won the 2016–17 Swiss Cup, defeating Sion 3–0 in the final.

Despite this success, Šporar decided to leave the club. He played a total of 26 competitive games for Basel, and scored one goal.

Arminia Bielefeld (loan) 
On 25 June 2017, Šporar joined 2. Bundesliga side Arminia Bielefeld on loan for the 2017–18 season.

Slovan Bratislava 
Šporar joined the Slovak Super Liga side Slovan Bratislava in January 2018 for a reported fee of €600,000. He helped the team win the 2017–18 Slovak Cup. In the 2018–19 season, he won the Slovak title and became the Slovak league's best goalscorer, scoring 29 goals and tying the record for most goals scored in a season.

Sporting 
On 23 January 2020, Šporar transferred to Sporting CP on a five-year contract for a transfer fee of €6 million, making him the most expensive player in the history of the Slovak Super Liga. With bonuses, the total transfer fee may eventually rise above €7 million.

Braga (loan) 
On 1 February 2021, Šporar joined Braga on loan for the remainder of the 2020–21 season.

Middlesbrough (loan) 
In August 2021 he joined English side Middlesbrough on loan. He scored his first goal for the club in a 2–0 win against Nottingham Forest on 15 September 2021.

Panathinaikos 
On 27 July 2022, Šporar signed a four-year contract with Super League Greece side Panathinaikos for a reported transfer fee of over €3 million.

International career
In November 2016, Šporar received his first call-up to the senior Slovenia squad for matches against Malta and Poland. He debuted against Malta, replacing Milivoje Novaković late in the second half.

Personal life
Andraž Šporar is the son of Olimpija's former captain Miha Šporar. In the past, Šporar has revealed that it is his ambition to earn a move to Liverpool, which is his favourite club, at some stage in his career. Liverpool followed the player in 2015, but in the end there was no transfer.

Career statistics

Club

International
Scores and results list Slovenia's goal tally first, score column indicates score after each Šporar goal.

Honours 
Basel
 Swiss Super League: 2015–16, 2016–17
 Swiss Cup: 2016–17

Slovan Bratislava
 Slovak Super Liga: 2018–19
 Slovak Cup: 2017–18

Sporting CP
 Primeira Liga: 2020–21
 Taça da Liga: 2020–21

Braga
 Taça de Portugal: 2020–21

Individual
 Slovenian PrvaLiga Top Scorer: 2015–16
 Slovak Super Liga Top Scorer: 2018–19, 2019–20
 Slovak Super Liga Player of the Year: 2018–19
Slovak Super Liga Player of the Month: November/December 2018, May 2019, November/December 2019
Slovak Super Liga Goal of the Month: October 2019
Slovak Super Liga Team of the Season: 2018–19, 2019–20
Super League Greece Player of the Month: August 2022

References

External links

Andraž Šporar at Swiss Football League

Andraž Šporar at NZS 

1994 births
Living people
Footballers from Ljubljana
Slovenian footballers
Slovenia youth international footballers
Slovenia under-21 international footballers
Slovenia international footballers
Association football forwards
Slovenian Second League players
Slovenian PrvaLiga players
Swiss Super League players
Swiss Promotion League players
2. Bundesliga players
Slovak Super Liga players
Primeira Liga players
English Football League players
Super League Greece players
NK IB 1975 Ljubljana players
NK Olimpija Ljubljana (2005) players
FC Basel players
Arminia Bielefeld players
ŠK Slovan Bratislava players
Sporting CP footballers
S.C. Braga players
Middlesbrough F.C. players
Panathinaikos F.C. players
Slovenian expatriate footballers
Expatriate footballers in Switzerland
Expatriate footballers in Germany
Expatriate footballers in Slovakia
Expatriate footballers in Portugal
Expatriate footballers in England
Expatriate footballers in Greece
Slovenian expatriate sportspeople in Switzerland
Slovenian expatriate sportspeople in Germany
Slovenian expatriate sportspeople in Slovakia
Slovenian expatriate sportspeople in Portugal
Slovenian expatriate sportspeople in England
Slovenian expatriate sportspeople in Greece